Gabriel Høyland (born 10 February 1955) is a former Norwegian football striker who played for Norwegian team Bryne. He is regarded as one of Bryne's finest players of all time, and was a key player in the team's 1980s glory days. He also won 23 caps for Norway, and scored three international goals.

He is the great-uncle of Erling Haaland.

References

External links

1955 births
Norwegian footballers
Norway international footballers
Living people
Bryne FK players
Norwegian football managers
Bryne FK managers
Association football forwards